The Aso is a  river in the Marche region of Italy. For most of its course the river marks the boundary between the provinces of Ascoli Piceno and Fermo
 

See also
 Latin names of rivers

References

Rivers of the Province of Ascoli Piceno
Rivers of the Province of Fermo
Rivers of Italy
Adriatic Italian coast basins